This is a list of newspapers in Kenya.

List of newspapers

See also
 Media of Kenya
 List of radio stations in Africa: Kenya
 Telecommunications in Kenya
 Sports Publications in Kenya

References

Bibliography
 
 
 
  (About Eldoret)

External links
 
 
 

Kenya
Newspapers